The Alfaya was the name given to the party from the mid-18th century that favored the clerical successors of the jihad leader Karamoko Alfa in the Imamate of Futa Jallon in what is now Guinea. 

They contended with the military group, the Soriya, who supported the successors of the war leader Ibrahim Sori. 
The rivalry between the two groups continued into the 20th century in Guinea.

References
Citations

Sources

Defunct political parties in Guinea
Islam in Guinea